Márk Heinrich (born 22 July 1989) is a Hungarian footballer who plays for MTE 1904.

References

External links
 HLSZ 

1989 births
Living people
People from Sopron
Hungarian footballers
Association football goalkeepers
FC Sopron players
Répcelak SE players
BFC Siófok players
Soproni VSE players
Mosonmagyaróvári TE 1904 footballers
Nemzeti Bajnokság I players
Nemzeti Bajnokság II players
Nemzeti Bajnokság III players
Hungarian expatriate footballers
Expatriate footballers in Austria
Hungarian expatriate sportspeople in Austria
Sportspeople from Győr-Moson-Sopron County
21st-century Hungarian people